Pizarrete is a town in the Peravia province of the Dominican Republic.

Sources 
 – World-Gazetteer.com

Populated places in Peravia Province